Country Road is a middle market clothing retailer with operations in Australia, New Zealand and South Africa. It is a subsidiary of Woolworths Holdings Limited.  its brands include Country Road, Mimco, Trenery, Politix, and Witchery.

History

Country Road was founded in 1974 by Stephen Bennett, initially as a niche women's shirting label. He took his inspiration for the name from the hit song Country Roads by John Denver. It grew rapidly to become Australia's first lifestyle brand. In 1981, Myer purchased Country Road, before listing it on the Australian Securities Exchange in 1987. In 1988, it expanded into homewares and the American market. By 1980 it was selling women's apparel and had product in department stores as well as in ten Country Road stores. In 1984, Country Road began producing menswear, then in 1986, it began producing accessories. Its growth during the 1990s extended in both product range and location, operating over 100 stores at its peak.

In 1998, Woolworths Holdings Limited acquired a controlling interest in the company. It was relaunched in July 2004 as a company that has higher volume sales and lower product prices, with its head office in Burnley, Victoria, and the Australian flagship store at Chadstone Shopping Centre.

Beginning 2003, Country Road entered into an exclusive agreement with Myer department stores. Under this agreement, Country Road agreed to sell exclusively to Myer and not to its main rival, David Jones. It also included joint marketing and in-store visual merchandising. This arrangement ended in January 2007 when Country Road became a concession store in David Jones and Myer stores. There were also stores in Boston, Chicago, New York City and other cities in the United States, as recently as 2000 or later, which closed due to weak sales.

In 2012, Country Road purchased Witchery Group, which include Witchery and Mimco. Having built up an 88% shareholding in the company, Woolworths Holdings Limited took full ownership in July 2014 when it purchased Solomon Lew's shareholding.

Description

Brands
Country Road operates several brands apart from the Country Road brand:
Mimco
Trenery
Politix
Witchery

References

Further reading

External links

Clothing brands of Australia
Clothing companies established in 1974
Clothing retailers of Australia
Clothing retailers of New Zealand
Companies based in Melbourne
Companies formerly listed on the Australian Securities Exchange
Defunct retail companies of the United States
Retail companies established in 1974
1974 establishments in Australia
Australian subsidiaries of foreign companies